Stegolophodon is an extinct genus of stegodontid proboscideans, with two tusks and a trunk. It lived during the Miocene and Pliocene epochs, and may have evolved into Stegodon. Fossils have been primarily found in Asia, but some have also been reported in Africa.

References

Stegodontidae
Miocene proboscideans
Pliocene proboscideans
Prehistoric placental genera
Neogene mammals of Asia
Fossil taxa described in 1917